The Georgia Southern–Georgia State rivalry, also known as Modern Day Hate, is a college athletics rivalry between the Georgia Southern Eagles and Georgia State Panthers. Both schools are members of the Sun Belt Conference (SBC). For the 2021–22 school year, the men's soccer rivalry temporarily moved to the Mid-American Conference, with both schools joining that league for men's soccer after the SBC disbanded its men's soccer league. However, SBC expansion in 2022 and the addition of three "Power Five" programs led to the reinstatement of SBC men's soccer effective in 2022–23. While the teams have only met eight times in football (due to Georgia State beginning their program in 2010), the rivalry dates back to the 1970s in basketball and other sports.

History
Georgia Southern and Georgia State have only competed against each other in football since 2014. They played annually in basketball from the 1971–72 to 1980–81 seasons, 1995–96 and 1996–97, and 2009–10 to 2013–14 out-of-conference and as conference mates from the 1985–86 to 1991–92 seasons in the Trans America Athletic Conference (which is now the ASUN Conference) and since the 2014–15 season in the Sun Belt Conference. Starting in December 2009, the two teams went nearly 10 years without losing a home game to their rival. The streak was snapped on March 9, 2019 when Georgia State won in Statesboro by a score of 90–85. Georgia Southern has a 38–26 lead in the all-time basketball series.

Because both schools can be abbreviated GSU, a point of conflict between the two is the claim by either fan base that their university is, in fact, "the real GSU." Georgia State lays claim to the initials as it became a university (and therefore GSU) in 1969 while Georgia Southern didn't achieve university status until 1990. Both schools are referred to as GSU colloquially in their region of the state, though Georgia State is the only one of the two that officially brands itself "GSU." In 2014, when Georgia Southern joined the Sun Belt Conference (the conference Georgia State joined the year prior), Georgia Southern updated its branding and media guidelines to explicitly state the school should be referred to as "Georgia Southern" or "GS" to avoid confusion in the media. But fixtures on their campus such as the "GSU" hedge and traditions like the marching band's "GSU Scramble" remain.

The rivalry intensified after the hire of former Appalachian State (longtime rival of Georgia Southern) athletic director Charlie Cobb to the same position at Georgia State University. During Georgia State's press release introducing Cobb, he revealed that Georgia Southern's athletic director Tom Kleinlein told him "welcome, now the war is on." The two teams first met on the gridiron during the 2014 football season. During the run up to the game, fans from both teams expressed their dislike for the other over social media outlets such as Twitter. Students at the time used the hashtags  "SouthernNotState" and "StateNotSouthern" in their tweets to differentiate which GSU they attended. Both schools adopted the phrases as a slogan that defined their side of the rivalry. During the period before the game, a beat writer for The Atlanta Journal-Constitution dubbed the matchup as "Modern Day Hate," a play on the rivalry between Georgia Tech and UGA, Clean, Old-Fashioned Hate. Georgia Southern beat Georgia State by a final score of 69–31 in the Georgia Dome in front of 28,427 fans. After the game, Georgia Southern fans unrolled a banner saying "Paulson Stadium North" claiming the stadium as their own and cementing the rivalry. The following season, Georgia State handed Georgia Southern their worst home defeat in school history with a final score of 34–7. Georgia State leads the football series 6–3.

Football game results

Men's basketball game results
Table shows results since both teams officially entered NCAA basketball competition with one another.

Men's soccer results 
Georgia State leads Georgia Southern 30–11–6 in men's soccer competitions.

Rivalry series
On October 1, 2015, both schools' athletic directors at the time announced the beginning of an annual "rivalry series" in which the winner takes home the Rivalry Series trophy and bragging rights at the following year's football game. The trophy was awarded to the school that defeats the other in a points-based system that encompasses all sports. Most wins counted as 1 point with football counting as 2 points. 2 points total were awarded to community service projects, and 1 to the school with the highest departmental GPA. 

In response to the COVID-19 pandemic, the Sun Belt Conference announced that all remaining spring sporting events after March 16 of that year would be suspended. Those sports included Men's and Women's Tennis, Men's and Women's Golf, Baseball, Softball, and Women's Outdoor Track and Field. 
Georgia Southern was leading 9–6 in the 2019–2020 rivalry series at that time.

On September 12, 2020, new Georgia Southern athletic director, Jared Benko, made a public statement that the all-sport rivalry series would be discontinued.

References

External links
Rivalry series point system 
Rivalry series scoring page

College sports rivalries in the United States
Georgia Southern Eagles
Georgia State Panthers
1972 establishments in Georgia (U.S. state)